Albanian Footballer of the Year is an annual award given to the best professional Albanian footballer elected by Football Association of Albania members, coaches and captains of the Kategoria Superiore clubs. The award can also be given to a foreign player in the Kategoria Superiore, as Croatian striker Pero Pejić was nominated for the 2014 award after becoming the first foreign player to win the golden boot for the 2013–14 season.

Winners

Number of awards per player

See also
Kategoria Superiore Player of the Month

References

Footballers in Albania
Albanian awards
Annual events in Albania
Association football player non-biographical articles
Association football player of the year awards by nationality